The 2018 National Ringette League Playoffs are the postseason tournament of 2017-18 National Ringette League season.

The Atlantic Attack won their first national title.

Regular Season Standing

Format 

The format is same as 2015-16.
The draws are E3 vs E8, E4 vs E7, E5 vs E6 and W3 vs W4.

Knockout stage

Eastern Conference

(3) Atlantic vs (8) Rive Sud 
Game 1

Atlantic leads the series 1-0

Game 2

Series ties at 1-1

Game 3

Atlantic wins the series 2-1

(4) Gatineau vs (7) Ottawa 
Game 1

Gatineau leads the series 1-0

Game 2

Gatineau wins the series 2-0

(5) Richmond Hill vs (6) Waterloo 
Game 1

Richmond Hill leads the series 1-0

Game 2

Series ties at 1-1

Game 3

Richmond Hill wins the series 2-1

West Conference

(3) Manitoba vs (4) BC 

Game 1

Manitoba leads the series 1-0

Game 2

Manitoba wins the series 2-0

Elite Eight 
x indicates clinches semifinal.
y indicates clinches final directly.
All games will play at Bell MTS Iceplex, Seven Oaks Arena and Bell MTS Place which located at Winnipeg from April 9 to April 13.

Semifinal 

Edmonton goes to the final

Final

Leaders 
Player except goalie
Goal 
 East: Martine Caissie (25, ATL)
 West: Justine Exner (12, CGY)
Assist
 East: Kaitlyn Youldon (23, GAT)
 West: Dailyn Bell (17, EDM)
 Point
 East: Martine Caissie (42, ATL)
 West: Dailyn Bell (24, EDM)
Goalie
Saving %
East Jessie Callander (.914, CAM)
West Bobbi Mattson (.887, CGY)
Goals against average
East Jessie Callander (3.00, CAM)
West Breanna Beck (3.89, EDM)
Win
East Karine Doiron (7, ATL)
West Breanna Beck (5, EDM)

References 

National Ringette League
Ringette
Ringette competitions